Robert David Crawford (born 19 March 1993) is a Scottish footballer who plays as a midfielder for USL Championship club Charleston Battery. He has previously played for Rangers, Raith Rovers, East Kilbride, FH, IFK Mariehamn, and Charleston Battery as well as spending time on loan at Greenock Morton and Alloa Athletic.

Career
Crawford joined Rangers aged eight and played in the club's youth sides before progressing to the first team in the 2012–13 season when the club was demoted to the bottom division. Despite featuring as an unused substitute in the previous season, Crawford made his professional debut on 29 July 2012 in a Challenge Cup against Brechin City. He went on to score his first goal for the club on 23 September in a league match against Montrose and went on to finish the season with a total of five goals and 27 appearances.

Crawford joined Greenock Morton on loan for the first part of the 2014–15 season. He made his first Rangers appearance in over a year against Hearts. The following season on 1 September 2015, Crawford joined Alloa Athletic on a season-long loan. On 18 August 2016, Crawford had his contract with Rangers terminated. He signed a short-term contract with Raith Rovers in November 2016.

On 23 December 2016, it was announced that Crawford mutually terminated his contract with Raith Rovers. In January 2017, Crawford played three games for Lowland Football League side East Kilbride, scoring two goals before heading to America. He appeared in one pre-season game for U.S. club North Carolina FC. On 5 April 2017, he joined Icelandic champions FH.

On 15 January 2019, IFK Mariehamn announced the signing of Crawford on a one-year contract.

On 4 February 2020, Crawford joined USL Championship club Charleston Battery.

On 1 April 2022, Crawford joined USL Championship club Monterey Bay. On July 21, 2022, Crawford made the move back to Charleston Battery.

Career statistics

Honours

Rangers
Scottish Third Division: 2012–13
Scottish League One: 2013–14

Greenock Morton
Scottish League One: 2014–15

References

External links

1993 births
Living people
Footballers from Greenock
Scottish footballers
Association football midfielders
Rangers F.C. players
Greenock Morton F.C. players
Alloa Athletic F.C. players
Scottish Football League players
Scottish Professional Football League players
Raith Rovers F.C. players
Fimleikafélag Hafnarfjarðar players
Charleston Battery players
Úrvalsdeild karla (football) players
Scottish expatriate footballers
Expatriate footballers in Iceland
Scottish expatriate sportspeople in Iceland
Expatriate footballers in Finland
Scottish expatriate sportspeople in Finland
Expatriate soccer players in the United States
Scottish expatriate sportspeople in the United States
IFK Mariehamn players
USL Championship players
Monterey Bay FC players